Azizul Huq Arzu is a Bangladesh Awami League politician and former Member of Parliament from Pabna-2.

Early life
Arzu was born on 7 April 1958. He has a master's degree in communication.

Career
Arzu served as the chairman of Bera Upazila. He was elected to parliament from Pabna-2 on 5 January 2014 as a Bangladesh Awami League candidate. In 2016 he was accused of violating the electoral code by Bangladesh Election Commission. He held an event at Dhobakhola Coronation High School and College in Bera upazila closing the school for three days in September 2018. The school was littered with rotten food leftover from the event. He was a member of the Parliamentary Standing Committee on Fisheries and Livestock Ministry. He has an allegation to illegally grabbed land belonging to the Roads and Highways Department (RHD) in Pabna.

References

Awami League politicians
Living people
1958 births
10th Jatiya Sangsad members
People from Pabna District